Omphaloceps is a genus of moths of the family Noctuidae. The genus was erected by George Hampson in 1901.

Taxonomy
The Global Lepidoptera Names Index gives this name as a synonym of Schausia Karsch, 1895.

Species
 Omphaloceps daria H. Druce, 1895
 Omphaloceps triangularis Mabille, 1893

References

Agaristinae